Colotis antevippe, the red tip, is a butterfly of the family Pieridae. It is found in the Afrotropical realm.

The wingspan is 40–45 mm. The adults fly year-round.

The larvae feed on Boscia albitrunca, Boscia oleoides, Capparis sepiara, Maerua cafra, and Maerua juncea.

Subspecies

The following subspecies are recognised:
C. a. antevippe (Mauritania, Senegal, Gambia, Mali, Guinea-Bissau, Guinea, Burkina Faso, Ghana, Benin, northern Nigeria, Niger, northern Cameroon)
C. a. zera (Lucas, 1852) (Sudan, Ethiopia, Uganda, Kenya, northern and western Tanzania, Democratic Republic of the Congo, south-western Saudi Arabia, Yemen, Oman)
C. a. gavisa (Wallengren, 1857) (Angola, Democratic Republic of the Congo, southern Tanzania, Malawi, Zambia, Mozambique, Zimbabwe, Botswana, Namibia, South Africa, Eswatini)

Gallery

References

Seitz, A. Die Gross-Schmetterlinge der Erde 13: Die Afrikanischen Tagfalter. Plate XIII 17

External links
Images representing Colotis antevippe at BOLD

Butterflies described in 1836
antevippe
Butterflies of Africa
Taxa named by Jean Baptiste Boisduval